The Bishop of Stockport is an episcopal title used by a suffragan bishop of the Church of England Diocese of Chester, in the Province of York, England. The title takes its name after the town of Stockport in Greater Manchester.

List of bishops

References

External links
 Crockford's Clerical Directory listings

Anglican suffragan bishops in the Diocese of Chester
 Bishops